A list of films produced by the Tollywood (Bengali language film industry) based in Kolkata in the year 1951.

A-Z of films

References

External links

1951
Lists of 1951 films by country or language
Films, Bengali